Matthias Lindner (born 5 October 1965 in Grimma, East Germany) is a former football defender.

He started playing football at the age of seven, with BSG Lokomotive Naunhof and joined the youth ranks of 1. FC Lokomotive Leipzig in 1976. After making his debut in May 1983 in the Oberliga he spent another eight seasons with the first team, making 156 league appearances and stayed with the club after they were renamed to VfB Leipzig. In 1997–98 he spent a season with FC Carl Zeiss Jena, before retiring in 2000 with FC Sachsen Leipzig.

Lindner won 22 caps for East Germany between 1987 and 1990.

References

External links 
 
 
 

1. FC Lokomotive Leipzig players
1965 births
Living people
German footballers
East German footballers
East Germany international footballers
FC Carl Zeiss Jena players
FC Sachsen Leipzig players
Bundesliga players
2. Bundesliga players
DDR-Oberliga players
Association football defenders
People from Grimma
Footballers from Saxony
People from Bezirk Leipzig